This is the complete list of Pan American medalists in surfing.

Medal table

Medalists

Men's events

Open Surf

SUP Surf

SUP Race

Longboard

Women's events

Open Surf

SUP Surf

SUP Race

Longboard

References

 
Surfing
Pan American Games